is a puzzle video game for the original Nintendo Game Boy. It was released by SETA Corporation in 1990.

In QBillion you control a mouse that, for reasons that are left unclear, has to reduce stacks of blocks to units one block high. This is represented by a grid in which several squares have numbers, representing how many blocks are there. The player can move a single block around, or push a block down off a stack. However, to push a block the player must be standing on a block one level lower than the block - i.e. to push a block off the top of a three-block stack, the player must be standing on a two-block stack.

Remake
A remake of QBillion called QBillion HD was made in 2014 by LTD Interactive. It featured HD graphics, online multiplayer, a level editor, and the original 30 levels. QBillion HD can be played online at http://qbillionhd.com

References

1989 video games
Game Boy games
Game Boy-only games
Puzzle video games
SETA Corporation games
Single-player video games
Video games about mice and rats
Video games developed in Japan
Winkysoft games